The Mixed team competition at the 2021 World Judo Championships was held on 13 June 2021.

Results

Bracket

Repechage brackets

Round of 16

IJF vs Ukraine

Russian Judo Federation vs Mongolia

Germany vs South Korea

Brazil vs Kazakhstan

Hungary vs Uzbekistan

France vs Netherlands

Cuba vs Georgia

Quarterfinals

Japan vs Ukraine

Russian Judo Federation vs South Korea

Brazil vs Uzbekistan

France vs Georgia

Semifinals

Japan vs Russian Judo Federation

Uzbekistan vs France

Repechage

Ukraine vs South Korea

Brazil vs Georgia

Third place

South Korea vs Uzbekistan

Brazil vs Russian Judo Federation

Final

Prize money
The sums listed bring the total prizes awarded to 200,000€ for the event.

References

External links
 
 Weight class draw and results on: International Judo Federation, JudoBase.org, live.ijf.org

Team
World Mixed Team Judo Championships
World 2021